Don't Dream, Annette is a 1949 German comedy film directed by Eberhard Klagemann and Helmut Weiss and starring Jenny Jugo, Max Eckard and Karl Schönböck. It was made by DEFA in the Soviet Zone of Germany which was soon afterwards to become East Germany.

The film's art direction was by Wilhelm Depenau, Otto Erdmann and Kurt Herlth.

Cast
Jenny Jugo as Annette
Max Eckard as Hans
Karl Schönböck as Klaus
Helmuth Rudolph as Theo
Gustav Waldau as The last Bourbone
Hans Stiebner as visitor in the concert hall
Walter Werner as visitor in the concert hall
Olga Limburg as Frau von Condé
Else Reval as Berta - Dienstmädchen
Erich Timm as Karl
Erwin Biegel as retired civil servant
Antonie Jaeckel as his wife
Erich Dunskus as bookbinder
Erik von Loewis as Monsieur Picard
Werner Segtrop as steward
Axel Triebel as Bourgeois
Paul Bildt
Waltraud Engel
O. W. Fischer
Lotte Jürgens
Waltraud Kogel
Leopold von Ledebur
Helmut Wolff

References

External links

East German films
German comedy films
1949 comedy films
Films directed by Helmut Weiss
German black-and-white films
1940s German films
1940s German-language films